My Network Places (formerly Network Neighborhood) is the network browser feature in Windows Explorer. It was first introduced in Windows 95 and Windows NT 4.0 and was renamed My Network Places in Windows 2000 and later.

My Network Places maintains an automatically updated history of computers which the user has accessed before, by default placed in a folder called , found in the user's user profile. The feature also allows enumerating all computers on the local network that support the Server Message Block (SMB) protocol and are open to discovery.

In a workgroup of fewer than 32 computers, the list of network destinations in My Network Places is generated by one of the computers on the network, which has been designated "Browse Master" (sometimes called "master browser"). The Browse Master is elected by system strength. Sometimes when similar systems are connected to a network, there might be a conflict between Browse Masters with unexpected consequences, such as the disappearance of the list altogether or some system becoming unreachable. A system can be forced to decline Browse Master status by disabling the Browser service and rebooting. In a workgroup of 32 computers or more, the shortcuts are created automatically when the user opens a shared network resource, such as a printer or shared folder.

Starting with Windows Vista, My Network Places is removed in favor of an integrated "Network" node in Windows Explorer. This node can only enumerate network computers but can do so via WS-Discovery and UPnP protocols, in addition to SMB.

See also
 Special folder

References

External links
 SecurityFriday: Hazard of "My Network Places" on Windows XP
 Computer Browser and common issues

Browsers
Windows communication and services
File system directories